Eduardo Souza may refer to:

 Eduardo do Nascimento Souza (born 1980), Brazilian football manager
 Eduardo Godinho Felipe de Souza (born 1981), Brazilian footballer
 Eduardo Prieto Souza (1882–?), Mexican Olympic fencer
 Eduardo Rodrigues Souza (born 1991)
 Eduardo de Souza (born 1944), Brazilian Olympic sailor